The Welch Foundation, based in Houston, Texas, is one of the United States' oldest and largest private funding sources for chemistry researchers. It is a non-profit organization named for Robert Alonzo Welch, an industrialist who provided the funds to set up the foundation, along with scholarships, endowments, and funding for chemical research. Since its founding in 1954, the organization has contributed to the advancement of chemistry through research grants, departmental grant programs, endowed chairs, scholarships, and other special projects at educational institutions in Texas. The foundation hosts an annual chemical research conference in Houston that attracts leading chemists from around the globe and also sponsors The Welch Award in Chemistry as well as the Norman Hackerman Award in Chemical Research.

Grants, scholarships, endowments, and awards
The Welch Award in Chemistry, currently a $500,000 award, which recognizes the value of chemical research contributions for the benefit of humankind.
The Norman Hackerman award in chemical research, currently a $100,000 award, which recognizes the work of young researchers in Texas.
The Robert A. Welch TILF (Texas Interscholastic League Foundation) Scholarship for students who participated in the University Interscholastic League and who wish to pursue a degree in chemistry, chemical engineering, or biochemistry. Currently $14,000 per student.
Research Grants support fundamental chemical research at universities, colleges, or other educational institutions within the state of Texas. 
Departmental Grants support chemical research by members of the chemistry department faculty at educational institutions in Texas.
Endowed Chairs provide a faculty position for an eminent scientist. To be considered for an endowed chair, a Texas education institution must have a Ph.D. program in chemistry.
 The Welch Foundation committed $100 million to establish the Welch Institute for Advanced Materials at Rice University.
Welch Summer Scholar Program is a hands-on summertime experience designed to give high school students a chance to learn more about research.  This is a five-week program which immerses students, typically between their junior and senior years of high school in the intellectual atmosphere of working with chemists in their labs.

The Welch Institute for Advanced Materials

In September 2020, The Welch Foundation committed $100 million to establish the Welch Institute for Advanced Materials at Rice University. The institute will be established as a joint venture between The Welch Foundation and Rice to perform research in advanced materials science.  The goal of The Welch Institute is to attract top researchers from around the world to collaborate with Rice University's internationally renowned faculty and scientific resources, making the Institute a center of intellectual discovery, innovation and transformation in advanced materials.

References

External links
 The Welch Foundation website

 
Non-profit organizations based in Texas